Marat Safin defeated Lleyton Hewitt in the final, 7–6(7–4), 6–0, 6–4 to win the singles tennis title at the 2002 Paris Masters. It was his second Paris Masters title.

Sébastien Grosjean was the defending champion, but lost in the third round to Carlos Moyá.

Seeds 
A champion seed is indicated in bold text while text in italics indicates the round in which that seed was eliminated.  All sixteen seeds received a bye into the second round.

Draw

Finals

Top half

Section 1

Section 2

Bottom half

Section 3

Section 4

References
 2002 BNP Paribas Masters Draw

2002 BNP Paribas Masters
Singles